Lāwai is a census-designated place (CDP) in Kauai County in the U.S. state of Hawaii. The population was 2,578 at the 2020 census, up from 1,984 at the 2000 census.

Geography
Lāwai is located on the southern side of the island of Kauai at  (21.925343, -159.507385). It is bordered to the west by Kalaheo and to the east by Omao. Hawaii Route 50 passes through Lawai, leading northeast  to Lihue and west  to Hanapepe.

Demographics

As of the census of 2000, there were 1,984 people, 711 households, and 531 families residing in the CDP. The racial makeup of the CDP was 35.4% White, 0.3% African American, 0.3% Native American, 30.8% Asian, 5.5% Pacific Islander, 1.4% from other races, and 26.4% from two or more races. Hispanic or Latino of any race were 11.8% of the population.

There were 711 households, out of which 32.2% had children under the age of 18 living with them, 60.6% were married couples living together, 9.1% had a female householder with no husband present, and 25.3% were non-families. 18.8% of all households were made up of individuals, and 6.2% had someone living alone who was 65 years of age or older.  The average household size was 2.79 and the average family size was 3.18.

In the CDP the population was spread out, with 24.8% under the age of 18, 7.1% from 18 to 24, 27.7% from 25 to 44, 27.0% from 45 to 64, and 13.4% who were 65 years of age or older.  The median age was 39 years. For every 100 females, there were 105.8 males.  For every 100 females age 18 and over, there were 104.2 males.

The median income for a household in the CDP was $55,662, and the median income for a family was $60,750. Males had a median income of $34,479 versus $30,761 for females. The per capita income for the CDP was $22,884.  About 2.7% of families and 4.9% of the population were below the poverty line, including 4.0% of those under age 18 and 0.8% of those age 65 or over.

Points of interest
 Allerton Garden
 McBryde Garden

Notable people
 Kaliko Kauahi, actress

References

 Save Our Seas -LawaiBay.Com

Census-designated places in Kauai County, Hawaii
Populated places on Kauai